The British Museum Act 1963 is an Act of the Parliament of the United Kingdom. It replaced the British Museum Act 1902. The Act forbids the Museum from disposing of its holdings, except in a small number of special circumstances. In May 2005 a judge of the High Court of England and Wales ruled that Nazi-looted Old Master artworks held at the museum could not be returned.

The Act also made the Natural History Museum an independent organisation, with its own board of trustees.

See also
British Museum Act

References

External links 
 The British Museum Act 1963, as amended, from Legislation.gov.uk

United Kingdom Acts of Parliament 1963
1963 in London
British Museum Acts
Art and cultural repatriation